The Whigham GW-5 is an American mid-wing, single seat, FAI Standard Class glider that was designed and constructed by Gene Whigham, a retired flight test engineer for Convair.

Design and development
The GW-5 was designed for the standard class and as such it features a constant-chord  wing with a Wortmann FX 61-184 airfoil and flaps for glidepath control.

The GW-5 is of all-metal construction. The landing gear is a faired fixed monowheel. The aircraft has a bubble canopy and a conventional low tail.

One GW-5 was built. It was completed in 1980 and registered with the Federal Aviation Administration in the Experimental - Amateur-built category.

Operational history
The sole GW-5 built was sold in September 2012 and the registration has expired. It is not known if the aircraft still exists or not.

Specifications (GW-5)

See also

References

1980s United States sailplanes
Homebuilt aircraft
Mid-wing aircraft
Aircraft first flown in 1980